is a Japanese football player currently playing for J1 League team Matsumoto Yamaga FC.

Career 
Having worked his way through the Shimizu S-Pulse youth system, he signed full professional terms at the start of the 2006 season. Yamamoto has represented his country at several levels up to an including Under 20, although has yet to break into the full national team.

Club statistics
Updated to 7 January 2019.

References

External links
Profile at JEF United Chiba

1987 births
Living people
Association football people from Shizuoka Prefecture
Japanese footballers
J1 League players
J2 League players
Shimizu S-Pulse players
Hokkaido Consadole Sapporo players
Kawasaki Frontale players
JEF United Chiba players
Matsumoto Yamaga FC players
Association football midfielders